

44001–44100 

|-
| 44001 Jonquet ||  || Pierre Jonquet, French astronomer, a founding member of the Astronomical Society at Montpellier, southern France || 
|-id=005
| 44005 Migliardi ||  || Marco Migliardi (born 1957), Italian teacher of Italian language and literature, amateur astronomer and friend of Vittorio Goretti who discovered this minor planet || 
|-id=011
| 44011 Juubichi ||  || Mount Juubichi (482 m), east of Nanyo city, Yamagata prefecture, Japan || 
|-id=013
| 44013 Iidetenmomdai ||  || Iide Tenmomdai (Iide Astronomical observatory) is located in the southern part of Yamagata prefecture, Japan. || 
|-id=016
| 44016 Jimmypage ||  || Jimmy Page (born 1944), OBE, British composer, producer and master guitarist, leader of the Yardbirds and Led Zeppelin || 
|-id=027
| 44027 Termain || 1998 AD || Patricia Ann Termain Eliason (born 1952), American support scientist for Viking, Voyager and other spacecraft missions, project manager for the GONG heliosiesmic program || 
|-id=033
| 44033 Michez ||  || Giacomo Michez (1839–1873), an Italian astronomer. || 
|-id=039
| 44039 de Sahagún ||  || Bernardino de Sahagún (1499–1590), a Franciscan missionary who after arriving in Mexico in 1529 researched the indigenous cultures of the country. || 
|}

44101–44200 

|-id=103
| 44103 Aldana ||  || Fernando Aldana Mayor (born 1944), Spanish astrophysicist, promoter of the 10-m Gran Telescopio Canarias || 
|-id=117
| 44117 Haroldlarson ||  || Harold P. Larson (born 1938), American pioneer of airborne infrared astronomy and educator at the University of Arizona || 
|-id=192
| 44192 Paulguttman ||  || Paul Guttman (1940–2013), a radiologist and entrepreneur || 
|}

44201–44300 

|-id=216
| 44216 Olivercabasa || 1998 PH || Josep Maria Oliver i Cabasa (born 1944), Spanish amateur astronomer, co-founder of the amateur astronomical society , also see 13260 Sabadell || 
|-id=217
| 44217 Whittle ||  || Frank Whittle (1907–1996), British aeronautical engineer and pilot, inventor of the turbo-jet engine || 
|-id=263
| 44263 Nansouty ||  || Charles-Marie-Étienne Champion Dubois de Nansouty (1815–1895), French general and meteorologist (fr-wiki) || 
|}

44301–44400 

|-id=368
| 44368 Andreafrigo ||  || Andrea Frigo (born 1982), an Italian friar and material scientist at the National Institute for Nuclear Physics (INFN) in Padua, who has been instrumental in refurbishing the planetarium of Amelia with astronomical instruments at the Santissima Annunziata convent in Umbria, Italy (Src). || 
|}

44401–44500 

|-id=455
| 44455 Artdula || 1998 VK || Arthur M. Dula (born 1947), a patent attorney, space lawyer and co-founder of several space technology companies. || 
|-id=473
| 44473 Randytatum || 1998 WB || Randy Tatum (born 1956) is an avid observer with the Association of Lunar and Planetary Observers (ALPO) and has served as Assistant Coordinator for the Jupiter and Solar Sections of the ALPO as well as full Solar Coordinator from 1993-96. He is the 2016 recipient of the ALPO Haas Award for his prolific and expert observing. || 
|-id=475
| 44475 Hikarumasai || 1998 WF || Hikaru Masai (born 1987) is a Japanese vocalist and original member of the musical group "Kalafina". || 
|-id=479
| 44479 Oláheszter ||  || Eszter Kiss (née Oláh, 1945–2004), mother of astronomer László L. Kiss, who co-discovered this minor planet || 
|}

44501–44600 

|-id=527
| 44527 Tonnon ||  || Anthonie Tonnon (born 1989) is a New Zealand musician. || 
|-id=530
| 44530 Horáková ||  || Milada Horáková (1901–1950), Czech lawyer and politician || 
|-id=574
| 44574 Lavoratti ||  || Piero Lavoratti (born 1935), Italian amateur astronomer || 
|-id=597
| 44597 Thoreau || 1999 PW || Henry David Thoreau (1817–1862), American essayist and naturalist || 
|}

44601–44700 

|-id=613
| 44613 Rudolf ||  || Rudolf II von Habsburg (1552–1612), Bohemian king and Holy Roman Emperor, who employed Tycho Brahe and Johannes Kepler as his court astronomers in Prague || 
|}

44701–44800 

|-id=711
| 44711 Carp ||  || The Hiroshima Toyo Carp, Japanese baseball team || 
|-id=717
| 44717 Borgoamozzano ||  || Borgo a Mozzano is an ancient Italian town in the province of Lucca, in Tuscany. On a wooded hill nearby is the Monte Agliale Astronomical Observatory, at which numerous asteroids and supernovae have been discovered. || 
|}

44801–44900 

|-id=821
| 44821 Amadora ||  || Amadora Gonzalez, Spanish wife of David Martínez-Delgado, who first observed this minor planet in September 1998 at the Las Campanas Observatory (more than a year before the actual discovery by the Catalina Sky Survey) || 
|-id=885
| 44885 Vodička || 1999 VB || Karel Vodička (1880–1957) was a mathematician and physicist with a deep interest in astronomy, director of Jirsík High School (1925–1935). He founded the South Bohemian Astronomical Society (JAS) in 1928 and served as the first director of České Budějovice Observatory (1928–1942) built by JAS. || 
|}

44901–45000 

|-bgcolor=#f2f2f2
| colspan=4 align=center | 
|}

References 

044001-045000